The Lachung River is a tributary of the Teesta River located in the East Indian state of Sikkim. It is a chief tributary of the Teesta, which is an important river in Sikkim along with Rangeet River. It is at Chungthang where the Lachung and Lachen rivers converge and give rise to the Teesta.

Course
The river has its source in a lake, deep in the Himalayas near the Indo-China border. The ragged reaches of the mountain make the place almost inaccessible. From here, the river flows down in a south-westerly direction and joins with another unknown river at a place just above Lachung village. The tributary river is also a slender one with little water in the winter. The river continues its course downwards through the Lachung valley till it meets River Lachen near Chungthang. After the confluence, it takes the name of River Teesta and flows further down. At Singhik another tributary river joins it, called the Talung Chug. After Rangpo, the Teesta widens and meets the River Rangeet at Melli Bazaar.

Tributaries
The Lachung has one main tributary, with which it unites near Lachung village. The water of the river is crystal clear and pure. The sparkling waters are the major source of living in the surrounding villages. There are a number of waterfalls and subsidiary streams across this river. In lachung town, there's banned package drinking water and total restrictions for usage. The crystal clear lachung water is used for drinking

References

Rivers of Sikkim
Rivers of India
Tributaries of the Teesta River